Charles Johnstone Willock (8 April 1862 – 19 March 1919) was an English cricketer. Willock was a right-handed batsman who bowled right-arm medium pace. He was born at Shahjehanpore in India.

Educated at Wellington College and later attending Trinity Hall, Cambridge, Willock made a single first-class appearance for Cambridge University against the Marylebone Cricket Club at Fenner's in 1883. He was dismissed in Cambridge University's first-innings of 100 for a duck by Wilfred Flowers, while in the Marylebone Cricket Club's first-innings of 159 he took the wickets of Billy Gunn and Percy de Paravicini to finish with figures of 2/18 from 28 overs. In the University's second-innings of 65, he was once again dismissed for a duck by Flowers, while in the Marylebone Cricket Club's successful chase, he dismissed Gunn for a second time. Later that season he made a single first-class appearance for Sussex against Hamshire at Day's Antelope Ground. In Hampshire's first-innings of 110, he bowled ten wicketless overs which conceded 5 runs, while he ended Sussex's first-innings of 94 unbeaten on 8. In Hampshire's second-innings of 180, he bowled five wicketless overs which conceded 9 runs. In Sussex's second-innings of 165, he was dismissed for 6 runs by William Dible, with Hampshire winning the match by 31 runs.

He died at Ryde on the Isle of Wight on 19 March 1919.

References

External links
Charles Willock at ESPNcricinfo
Charles Willock at CricketArchive

1862 births
1919 deaths
People from Shahjahanpur
People educated at Wellington College, Berkshire
Alumni of Trinity Hall, Cambridge
English cricketers
Cambridge University cricketers
Sussex cricketers
British people in colonial India